RYOT  (or, riot) is an American immersive media company founded in 2012 by Bryn Mooser, David Darg, Molly DeWolf Swenson and Martha Rogers, based in Los Angeles. It specializes in documentary film production, commercial production, virtual reality and augmented reality.

In April 2016, RYOT was acquired by HuffPost.

In May 2021, RYOT was acquired by Apollo Global Management alongside other Verizon Media properties for $5 billion. The transaction was closed on September 1, 2021.

History

Founding and early years 
Bryn Mooser and David Darg met in Haiti during the weeks after the earthquake of January 2010. Both were in the country doing humanitarian work, Mooser with Artists for Peace and Justice, to build a school, and Darg with Operation Blessing, to build water and sanitation systems. After working alongside each other and becoming friends, Mooser and Darg had the idea to create a baseball league for the young boys of the Tabarre neighborhood of Port-au-Prince.[2][3]

Soon after, Mooser and Darg returned home to America, brought on Molly DeWolf Swenson as COO, and launched RYOT News as “the first news site linking news to action.”

Founding investors are Canadians Martha Rogers and Gareth Seltzer, and other notable funders include Todd Wagner and Jason Calacanis.

Celebrity activists Olivia Wilde, Ian Somerhalder, Ben Stiller and Sophia Bush were early supporters of RYOT and endorse their efforts worldwide. Olivia Wilde and Elon Musk are Executive Producers on numerous RYOT Films.

Founding Directors of the company alongside Mooser and Darg were Stash Slionski and Stacey Leasca while the first reporters included Benjamin Roffee, Vanessa Black, Stefan Todorovic, Tyson Sadler and Christian Stephen.

2015-present: VR and later productions
RYOT began producing 360/VR videos for other media organizations, advertisers and nonprofits in 2015. In their first  produced 360/VR films for partners such as The New York Times,[4] NPR,[5] The Associated Press,[6] Huffington Post[7] and Sierra Club.[8]

RYOT is credited as the first company to capture in 360 video,1. An active war zone (Syria), a disaster zone (Nepal), underwater with wild dolphins (Bahamas), and is the first company to produce VR news and comedy series on a major network (Hulu).

RYOT has received numerous awards for its documentary filmmaking, including two consecutive Oscar nominations for Best Documentary Short (2016 & 2017), a Peabody nomination and an Emmy nomination.

Divisions 

RYOT Studio is Verizon Media's in-house branded content agency.

RYOT Films creates award-winning content in traditional & immersive formats across film, TV, digital, and VR, producing content for nonprofits and brand partners including The New York Times, NPR, The Associated Press, Huffington Post and Sierra Club.

RYOT Lab is Verizon Media’s technology and innovation hub for emerging technologies, in partnership with Verizon Lab.

Awards and nominations 
RYOT Films was nominated for an Academy Award for Best Documentary (Short Subject) for Body Team 12 in January 2016. Body Team 12 was also honored at the Tribeca Film Festival, the Mountainfilm Festival, the Palm Springs International Film Festival, and the Austin Film Festival for Best Documentary Short.

Linear filmography 

Mooser and Darg documented their work with the young boys in Haiti in their Tribeca award-winning film Baseball in the Time of Cholera, which follows the rise of the Tabarre Tigers and the concurrent outbreak of Cholera in Haiti. The film played at film festivals around the world and finished with a special Congressional screening in Washington, D.C.

A year later, Mooser and Darg, debuted their third film at the 2013 Tribeca Film Festival, a documentary short titled The Rider and The Storm, which chronicles a New York surfer who lost everything in the Breezy Point fires during Hurricane Sandy.

Executive-produced by Olivia Wilde and Paul Allen, RYOT's Oscar-nominated Body Team 12 profiles a young Liberian health worker who collects the bodies of the dead in Monrovia at the height of the Ebola outbreak in 2014, and won Best Short Documentary at the Tribeca Film Festival 2015. It debuted on HBO in February 2016. On Her Shoulders, a documentary about Nadia Murad's fight against ISIS, debuted in competition at Sundance Film Festival in January 2018, where it won a Directing award for a U.S. Documentary.

The Painter of Jalouzi was the first documentary to be shot entirely on an iPhone 6S Plus.

Virtual reality filmography

References

External links 

 

Yahoo!
2016 mergers and acquisitions
American news websites
Internet-based activism